Autochloris jansonis is a moth of the subfamily Arctiinae. It was described by Arthur Gardiner Butler in 1872. It is found in Costa Rica, Panama and Colombia.

References

Arctiinae
Moths described in 1872
Moths of Central America
Moths of South America